Cyanopepla jucunda is a moth of the subfamily Arctiinae. It was described by Francis Walker in 1854. It is found in the Brazilian states of Rio de Janeiro and Espírito Santo and in Argentina.

References

Cyanopepla
Moths described in 1854